The United States women's national lacrosse team represents the United States in the World Lacrosse World Cup championships held every four years. The team was first selected in 1933 after the  United States Women's Lacrosse Association was founded in 1931. The team has won nine championships, including the last championship, which was in 2022.

Current roster
The following 18 players were named to the squad for the 2022 World Lacrosse Women's World Championship.

Team records

World Lacrosse Women's World Championship
The team has participated in every World Cup through 2022 and have won a medal in every appearance.

References

External links 

 United States Women's Lacrosse Association records at the University of Maryland Libraries

See also

Women's lacrosse teams in the United States
Lacrosse
National lacrosse teams